"Stool Pigeon" is a 1982 song by Kid Creole & The Coconuts. It was the second single to be released from the group's third studio album Tropical Gangsters. It reached a peak of #7 on the UK Singles Chart and #25 on the US US Club Play Chart. August Darnell, the lead singer of Kid Creole & The Coconuts, was a great fan of the 1940s dress style, which for gangsters was double breasted pinstriped suits and hats. "Stool Pigeon", which Darnell wrote, was a tribute to this whole genre.

The 12" remix of "Stool Pigeon" features a guitar solo by Chic guitarist Nile Rodgers.

Track listing

Charts

References

External links
 Video On YouTube
 Page On Discogs

1982 songs
1982 singles
Kid Creole and the Coconuts songs
Songs written by August Darnell